Azizov is a surname. Notable people with the surname include:

Abdusalom Azizov (born 1960), Uzbek military leader
Akif Azizov (1943–2016), Azerbaijani chemist, academician, professor
Elchin Azizov (born 1975), Azerbaijani operatic baritone
Emin Azizov (born 1984), Azerbaijani wrestler
Faig Azizov (born 1966), Azerbaijani footballer
Magomed Azizov (born 1969), Russian wrestler
Mehman Azizov (born 1976),  Azerbaijani judoka
Minneula Azizov (born 1951), Russian field hockey player
Ramin Azizov (born 1988),  Azerbaijani taekwondo practitioner
Zija Azizov (born 1998), Azerbaijani footballer